
Gmina Strzelce is a rural gmina (administrative district) in Kutno County, Łódź Voivodeship, in central Poland.

Villages
Gmina Strzelce contains the villages and settlements of Aleksandrów, Bielawy, Bociany, Dąbkowice, Dębina, Długołęka, Glinice, Holendry Strzeleckie, Janiszew, Karolew, Klonowiec Stary, Kozia Góra, Marianka, Marianów, Marianów Dolny, Muchnice, Muchnice Nowe, Muchnów, Niedrzaków, Niedrzakówek, Niedrzew Drugi, Niedrzew Pierwszy, Nowa Kozia Góra, Przyzórz, Rejmontów, Siemianów, Sójki, Sójki-Parcel, Strzelce, Wieszczyce, Wola Raciborowska, Zaranna and Zgórze.

Neighbouring gminas
Gmina Strzelce is bordered by the gminas of Gostynin, Kutno, Łanięta, Oporów and Szczawin Kościelny.

References
Polish official population figures 2006

Strzelce
Kutno County